Anton Johann Nepomuk Seder (11 January 1850, Munich - 1 December 1916, Strasbourg) was an Art Nouveau designer, art professor and Director of the Kunstgewerbeschule (Arts and Crafts School) in Strasbourg.

Biography 
His father, Christian Seder, was an inspector of army equipment. At the age of nineteen, he enrolled at the Academy of Fine Arts, Munich. His career began in 1878, teaching architecture at the Technikum in Winterthur, Switzerland. In 1882. he returned to Munich, where he worked as a sculptor at the Academy. He also made several brief study trips to Italy. 

In 1889, he was appointed Director of the new , winning out over thirty-nine other candidates. Exhibits held during the 1890s cemented the school's reputation as an innovative institution and spread its influence throughout Germany. Among the major changes he made were his emphasis on the workshop over the classroom, and the hiring of younger teachers, who were more open to experimentation.

As the 20th century began, and styles changed, not all went well. In 1907, he was criticized by former students who were unable to find work. As World War I approached, local artists complained that the school was too German. By the time of Seder's retirement in 1915, its once high reputation was largely gone.

In addition to teaching, he created decorative panels for the entrance hall and stairwell at the Institute of Zoology (now part of the University of Strasbourg). His works on the Pont d'Auvergne, a bridge near the University, have not been preserved. He was also involved in goldsmithing and ironwork. Some grillwork for Sainte-Madeleine Church (now at the Strasbourg Museum of Modern and Contemporary Art) is a notable example.

As an author, he published at least ten books on drawing and painting between 1882 and 1903. From 1901, he was a co-editor at the professional journal, Das Kunstgewerbe in Elsass-Lothringen.

Sources 
 Jean-Claude Richez: Städtische Kunstgewerbeschule Straßburg (1889–1914). (PDF-Datei; 1,3 MB).
 "Seder, Anton". In: Hans Vollmer (Ed.): Allgemeines Lexikon der Bildenden Künstler von der Antike bis zur Gegenwart. Vol.30: Scheffel–Siemerding. E. A. Seemann, Leipzig 1936, pg.422.

External links 

 Books by Anton Seder @ WorldCat
 Biographical notes by Felicitas Seder

1850 births
1916 deaths
German designers
German art directors
Art Nouveau
Alsatian-German people
Academy of Fine Arts, Munich alumni
Artists from Munich